On the Marble Cliffs (Auf den Marmorklippen) is a novella by Ernst Jünger published in 1939 describing the upheaval and ruin of a serene agricultural society. It was published that year by Hanseatische Verlagsanstalt (de) in Hamburg, Germany.

Synopsis
The peaceful and traditional people, located on the shores of a large bay, are surrounded by the rough pastoral folk in the surrounding hills, who feel increasing pressure from the unscrupulous and lowly followers of the dreaded head forester. The narrator and protagonist lives on the marble cliffs as a botanist with his brother Otho, his son Erio from a past relationship and Erio's grandmother Lampusa. The idyllic life is threatened by the erosion of values and traditions, losing its inner power. The head forester uses this opportunity to establish a new order based on dictatorial rule, large numbers of mindless followers and the use of violence, torture and murder.

The tale may readily be understood as a parable on national socialism, the evil and "jovial" head forester being Hermann Göring. Others see it as a description of Germany's fight against the threat of Stalinism or communism, the head forester (or "chief ranger") being Joseph Stalin. Following this interpretation the book would have predicted in 1939 the ultimate failure of Germany's imminent war against the Soviet Union. The book was not censored in Nazi Germany, perhaps due to Jünger's significant repute in right-wing circles.

Its sharp disapproval of violent masses, as well as its prediction or description of death camps, was noted and helped Jünger's rehabilitation after the Second World War although he had not gone into exile like most anti-Nazi authors. Jünger himself, however, refused the notion that the book was a statement of resistance, describing it rather as a "shoe that fits various feet".

The work is typical for Jünger's Aestheticism that responds to destruction with placidity. It displays the determination to conserve values even in the face of annihilation, perhaps all the more so because the victory of the mindless masses follows brutalization as a virtual force of nature.

Notes

External links
   English Language copy of book
Excerpts from the English translation by Stuart Hood 

1939 German-language novels
1939 short stories
German short stories
German novellas
Novels by Ernst Jünger
1939 German novels
Novels adapted into operas